A teddy bear is a stuffed toy in the form of a bear. Developed apparently simultaneously by toymakers Morris Michtom in the U.S. and Richard Steiff under his aunt Margarete Steiff's company in Germany in the early 20th century, the teddy bear, named after President Theodore Roosevelt, became a popular children's toy and has been celebrated in story, song, and film.

Since the creation of the first teddy bears which sought to imitate the form of real bear cubs, "teddies" have greatly varied in form, style, color, and material. They have become collector's items, with older and rarer teddies appearing at public auctions. Teddy bears are among the most popular gifts for children and are often given to adults to signify affection, congratulations, or sympathy.

History

The name teddy bear comes from former United States President Theodore Roosevelt, who was often referred to as "Teddy" (though he loathed being referred to as such). The name originated from an incident on a bear hunting trip in Mississippi in November 1902, to which Roosevelt was invited by Mississippi Governor Andrew H. Longino. There were several other hunters competing, and most of them had already killed an animal.  A suite of Roosevelt's attendants, led by Holt Collier, cornered, clubbed, and tied an American black bear to a willow tree after a long exhausting chase with hounds.  They called Roosevelt to the site and suggested that he shoot it.  He refused to shoot the bear himself, deeming this unsportsmanlike, but instructed that the bear be killed to put it out of its misery, and it became the topic of a political cartoon by Clifford Berryman in The Washington Post on November 16, 1902. While the initial cartoon of an adult black bear lassoed by a handler and a disgusted Roosevelt had symbolic overtones, later issues of that and other Berryman cartoons made the bear smaller and cuter.

Morris Michtom saw the Berryman drawing of Roosevelt and was inspired to create a teddy bear. He created a tiny soft bear cub and put it in his candy shop window at 404 Tompkins Avenue in Brooklyn with a sign "Teddy's bear." The toys were an immediate success and Michtom founded the Ideal Novelty and Toy Co.

A little earlier in 1902 in Germany, the Steiff firm produced a stuffed bear from Richard Steiff's designs. Steiff exhibited the toy at the Leipzig Toy Fair in March 1903, where it was seen by Hermann Berg, a buyer for George Borgfeldt & Company in New York (and the brother of composer Alban Berg). He ordered 3,000 to be sent to the United States. Although Steiff's records show that the bears were produced, they are not recorded as arriving in the U.S., and no example of the type, "55 PB", has ever been seen, leading to the story that the bears were shipwrecked. However, the shipwreck story is disputed – author Günther Pfeiffer notes that it was only recorded in 1953 and says it is more likely that the 55 PB was not sufficiently durable to survive until the present day. Although Steiff and Michtom were both making teddy bears at around the same time, neither would have known of the other's creation due to poor transatlantic communication.

North American educator Seymour Eaton wrote the children's book series The Roosevelt Bears, while composer John Walter Bratton wrote an instrumental "The Teddy Bears' Picnic", a "characteristic two-step", in 1907, which later had words written to it by lyricist Jimmy Kennedy in 1932.

Early teddy bears were made to look like real bears, with extended snouts and beady eyes.  Modern teddy bears tend to have larger eyes and foreheads and smaller noses, babylike features intended to enhance the toy's "cuteness".  Some teddy bears are also designed to represent different species, such as polar bears and brown bears, as well as pandas and koalas.

While early teddy bears were covered in tawny mohair fur, modern teddy bears are manufactured in a wide variety of commercially available fabrics, most commonly synthetic fur, but also velour, denim, cotton, satin, and canvas.

Production

Commercial
Commercially made, mass-produced teddy bears are predominantly made as toys for children. These bears either have safety joints for attaching arms, legs, and heads, or else the joints are sewn and not articulated. They must have securely fastened eyes that do not pose a choking hazard for small children. These "plush" bears must meet a rigid standard of construction in order to be marketed to children in the United States and in the European Union.

There are also companies, like Steiff, that sell handmade collectible bears that can be purchased in stores or over the Internet.
The majority of teddy bears are manufactured in countries with low production costs, such as China and Indonesia. A few small, single-person producers in the United States make unique, non-mass-produced teddy bears. In the United Kingdom one small, traditional teddy bear company remains, Merrythought, which was established in 1930. Mohair, the fur shorn or combed from a breed of long haired goats, is woven into cloth, dyed and trimmed.

Amateur
Teddy bears are a favourite form of soft toy for amateur toy makers, with many patterns commercially produced or available online. Many "teddies" are home-made as gifts or for charity, while "teddy bear artists" often create "teddies" for retail, decorating them individually with commercial and recycled ornaments such as sequins, beads and ribbons.  Sewn teddy bears are made from a wide range of materials including felt, cotton and velour. While many are stitched, others are made from yarn, either knitted or crocheted.

Cultural impact

Retail sales of stuffed plush animals including teddy bears totaled $1.3 billion in 2006, with manufacturers including Gund and Ty Inc. 

Teddy bear plush toys have enjoyed ongoing popularity, complete with specialty retailers such as Teddy Atelier Stursberg and Vermont Teddy Bear Company, as well as do-it-yourself chains including Build-A-Bear Workshop.

Museums
The world's first teddy bear museum was set up in Petersfield, Hampshire, England, in 1984. In 1990, a similar foundation was set up in Naples, Florida, United States. These were closed in 2006 and 2005 respectively, and the bears were sold in auctions, but there are many teddy bear museums around the world today.

Emergency services
Because police, fire and medical officials found that giving a teddy bear to a child during a crisis stabilized and calmed them, NAPLC created the Teddy Bear Cops program to distribute teddy bears to police, fire, and medical responders throughout the United States.

April Fools' Day
On April Fools' Day 1972, issue 90 of The Veterinary Record published a paper on the diseases of Brunus edwardii detailing common afflictions of teddy bears.

World's largest teddy bear
The largest teddy bear measures 19.41 m (63 ft 8 in) in length and was constructed by Municipio de Xonacatlán, Ideas por México and Agrupación de Productores de Peluche (all Mexico), in Estado de México, on 28 April 2019.
The bear was displayed at the local stadium in the city of Xonacatlán, and was made with the same materials as a commercially available teddy bear, including details such as a tiara, dress, eyes, and nose.

In popular culture
 The original toy inspired John Walter Bratton to compose the melody to "Teddy Bears' Picnic" in 1907, with lyrics by Jimmy Kennedy added in 1932.
Rupert Bear comic has appeared in Daily Express since November 1920.
 Winnie-the-Pooh is based on a teddy bear owned by Christopher Robin Milne, the son of author A. A. Milne; the character first appeared in a 1926 children's book and has been adapted by Disney for animated shorts since 1966.
 Sooty began broadcasting on British television in 1955.
 Paddington Bear is based on a teddy bear purchased by the British author Michael Bond, first appearing in a 1958 children's book.
 Corduroy is a 1968 children's book based on an anthropomorphic teddy bear in a department store.
 SuperTed is a superhero teddy bear in an animated television series first airing in 1982.
 Care Bears were first produced as colorful plush teddy bears in 1983.
 Pudsey Bear has been the mascot for Children in Need since 1985.
 Teddy Ruxpin was the best-selling toy of 1985 and 1986.
 Teddy is a knitted toy oddity in the 1990s sitcom Mr. Bean.
 Misery Bear was featured in a series of fourteen shorts for the BBC website between 2009 and 2012.
 Ted (2012), and its 2015 sequel, bases its adult comedy on a teddy bear come to life.
 Teddy is a 2021 Tamil-language fantasy action film.

References

External links 

 The great teddy bear shipwreck mystery

 
1900s toys
2000s toys
Bears in popular culture
Cultural depictions of Theodore Roosevelt
Products introduced in 1902
Stuffed toys
Toy animals
1900s neologisms